The Battle Creek Belles were a women's professional baseball team that played from  through  in the All-American Girls Professional Baseball League. The Belles represented Battle Creek, Michigan, and played their home games at Bailey Park.

History

The Belles finished last in the first half of the 1951 season with an 11–45 record before improving to 19–35 in the second half for a 30-80 overall. The team posted a 43–67 record in the 1952 season, and finished in last place.

The club moved to Muskegon for the  season and was renamed the Muskegon Belles.

All-time roster
Bold denotes members of the inaugural roster

Agnes Allen
Isabel Alvarez
Phyllis Baker
Patricia Barringer
Fern Battaglia
Erma Bergmann
Rita Briggs
Patricia Brown
Marge Callaghan
Jean Cione
Donna Cook
Bonnie Cooper
Gloria Cordes
Betty Jane Cornett
Pauline Crawley
Mary Dailey
Gertrude Dunn
Mary Froning
Barbara Galdonik
Gertrude Ganote 
Eileen Gascon
Josephine Hasham
Beverly Hatzell
Ruby Heafner
Jean Holderness
Frances Janssen 
Marilyn Jones
Erma Keyes
Glenna Sue Kidd
Jaynie Krick
Sophie Kurys
Noella Leduc
Shirley Luhtala
Betty McKenna
Marie Mansfield
Mirtha Marrero
Naomi Meier
Ruth Middleton
Jane Moffet
Rose Montalbano
Mary Moore
Nancy Mudge
Dolly Niemieck
Anna Mae O'Dowd
Barbara Payne
Marguerite Pearson
June Peppas
Migdalia Pérez
Ernestine Petras
Marjorie Pieper
Janet Rumsey
Margaret Russo
Gloria Schweigerdt
Mary Sheehan
Doris Shero
Norma Sieg
Hazel Smith
Shirley Sutherland
Miss Thatcher
Frances Vukovich
Helen Waddell
Margaret Wenzell
Betty Whiting
Sadie Wright
Janet Young

Managers

Chaperone

Sources

All-American Girls Professional Baseball League official website – Battle Creek Belles seasons
All-American Girls Professional Baseball League official website – Manager/Player profile search results
All-American Girls Professional Baseball League Record Book – W. C. Madden. Publisher: McFarland & Company, 2000. Format: Hardcover, 294pp. Language: English. 
The Women of the All-American Girls Professional Baseball League: A Biographical Dictionary – W. C. Madden. Publisher:  McFarland & Company, 2005. Format: Softcover, 295 pp. Language: English. 

All-American Girls Professional Baseball League teams
1951 establishments in Michigan
1952 disestablishments in Michigan
Baseball teams established in 1951
Baseball teams disestablished in 1952
Sports in Battle Creek, Michigan
Defunct baseball teams in Michigan
Women's sports in Michigan